Pokémon Ranger and the Temple of the Sea, is a 2006 Japanese animated fantasy film, the ninth in the Pokémon film series, and the fourth and last to be set in the Advanced Generation series. Directed by Kunihiko Yuyama and written by Hideki Sonoda, the story follows the Pokémon trainer Ash Ketchum, his Pikachu (Ikue Ōtani), and his friends May, Max and Brock as they help a Pokémon Ranger named Jack Walker deliver the Mythical Pokémon Manaphy to an undersea palace called Samiya while evading mercenaries led by Phantom the Pirate.

It was released on July 16, 2006 in Japan, and aired on Cartoon Network in North America on March 23, 2007. It is also the first Pokémon movie to be not be dubbed in English by 4Kids Entertainment, but instead by The Pokemon Company International. It also the last film to use hand-painted cel animation, as starting with The Rise of Darkrai, all film's would use digital ink and paint. The events of the film take place during the ninth season of Pokémon.

Plot 
An egg belonging to the Mythical Pokémon Manaphy is found floating in the sea by mercenary Phantom the Pirate, but it is subsequently stolen from him by Jack "Jackie" Walker, a Pokémon Ranger disguised as one of Phantom's crew members. Walker escapes Phantom's ship and joins the Marina Group, a traveling circus family that specializes in Water-type Pokémon, to deliver the Manaphy egg to Samiya, an undersea palace built by the People of the Water, whom the Marina Group are descendants of. Pokémon Trainer Ash Ketchum, his Pikachu, and their friends Brock, May, and Max become lost on their journey and encounter the Marina Group in their search for water, inadvertently becoming involved with Walker's mission.

When Phantom leads an assault after the Egg, Manaphy hatches in May's arms, who presumes she is its mother. The group eventually escapes Phantom by running into a network of ruins belonging to the People of the Water, where Ash and his friends learn about Samiya. Walker declines Ash and his friends' further involvement with his mission and departs in a boat with the Marina Group toward Samiya. However, Manaphy shows discomfort and starts crying without May's presence, forcing Ash and his friends along anyway. Manaphy's natural instincts lead the boat toward Samiya, and to Walker's dismay, May and Manaphy bond closer. Walker warns May of Manaphy's destiny to become Samiya's leader and that she will eventually need to part ways with it. May understands, but is distraught nonetheless. Lizabeth, the Marina Group's daughter, comforts May and gives her a bracelet known as the People of the Water's Mark as a memento of her time with Manaphy. One day, May loses her bandanna to the wind and Manaphy embarks far into the ocean to retrieve it. Ash and his friends, board a submarine operated by Lizabeth to search for Manaphy, eventually finding it along with Samiya during the expected lunar eclipse. Unbeknownst to them, Phantom had been in pursuit the whole time.

While exploring Samiya, the group encounters Phantom, who is able to open the chamber to the Sea Crown, the temple's central artifact consisting of numerous large crystals. Phantom begins to remove the crystals, causing Samiya to flood and sink deeper into the ocean. The group escapes to the submarine while Walker confronts Phantom, reconnecting most of the crystals to the crown before he, Phantom, and one of the crystals are washed away by the flood. Determined to save its home, Manaphy returns to the Crown's chamber with Ash, Pikachu and May in tow, while Lizabeth, Brock, and Max are forced to depart in the submarine. Ash and May reconnect the remaining crystals but notice one is missing. While escaping the flood, Ash finds the last crystal in a fountain. He puts Pikachu, May, and Manaphy in an air capsule that used to be part of Phantom's submarine before diving into the completely flooded crown chamber and reconnecting the crystal, causing Samiya to rise to the ocean's surface.

While May and Pikachu mourn Ash's apparent sacrifice, Phantom appears and kidnaps Manaphy. Ash, surrounded by a glowing aura from the newly rebuilt Sea Crown, pursues Phantom and retrieves Manaphy. Phantom returns with his ship, but Manaphy leads an assault with several wild Water-type Pokémon to destroy the ship and subdue Phantom in its rubble. With Phantom defeated, Walker is able to deliver Manaphy safely to Samiya, completing his mission. May and Manaphy share a heartfelt farewell before the group watches Samiya return to depths of the ocean. Ash and his friends separate from Walker and the Marina Group and continue on their journey.

In the credits, it is revealed that Phantom and his first mate Galen were either arrested and put in jail or still subdued in its rubble.

Cast 
Note: Pokemon Ranger and the Temple of the Sea is the first film in the series to be released since Pokémon USA's acquisition of US distribution from 4Kids Entertainment, which resulted in a new English voice cast.

Production 
On December 9, 2005, the title for the ninth Pokémon feature film was revealed to be Pokémon Ranger and the Prince of the Sea in the Japanese children's program Oha Suta on TV Tokyo. Setting designs were inspired by cities and ruins in Italy, particularly in Rome, Naples, and Capri.

Music 

Shinji Miyazaki, the composer for the Pokémon television series, also composed the score for Pokémon Ranger. The film's soundtrack was released on July 26, 2006.

 Track listing

Release

Theatrical run 
Pokémon Ranger and the Temple of the Sea was released in Japan on July 15, 2006 with a 105 minute running time. The film was distributed by Toho in Japan.

TV broadcast 
In North America, Pokémon Ranger and the Temple of the Sea was aired on Cartoon Network on March 23, 2007.

Home media 
The original Japanese version of the film was released on DVD on December 22, 2006. The English dub was first released in North America on April 3, 2007. It was later released in Australia nearly a year later, on February 6, 2008. The American set included the Pikachu short , which was previously shown in August 2006 as an exclusive in-flight short film on the Pokémon Jet of All Nippon Airways (ANA).

The film has yet to be released on DVD in the United Kingdom although it has been released in UK iTunes Store. Blu-ray Release on December 13, 2021 in the UK.

Reception

Box office performance 
The general screening of Pokémon Ranger and the Prince of the Sea: Manaphy ran for 6 weeks, from July 15 to August 25, 2006.

 July 15–16, 2nd overall, 2nd domestic, 1st anime
 July 22–23, 3rd overall, 2nd domestic, 1st anime
 July 29–30, 4th overall, 3rd domestic, 2nd anime
 August 5–6, 5th overall, 4th domestic, 2nd anime
 August 12–13, 4th overall, 3rd domestic, 2nd anime
 August 19–20, 6th overall, 4th domestic, 2nd anime

Critical reception 
Pokémon Ranger and the Prince of the Sea received mixed reviews. Film Music Central gave it a positive review saying that "that being said, I can’t really say anything bad about the story, it was fun, it was tear-jerking (yet another Pokémon film that made me cry), and if you’re looking for a good time you’ll definitely find it with this story"

Notes

References

External links 

 Official Japanese Movie Page
 Pokemon.com's Manaphy Promotion Page
 
 

2006 anime films
2000s Japanese-language films
Films directed by Kunihiko Yuyama
Japanese sequel films
Pirate films
Ranger and the Temple of the Sea
Sea adventure films
Toho animated films
Viz Media anime
Films scored by Shinji Miyazaki
OLM, Inc. animated films
Films set in Italy